Marra may refer to:
 Marra (folklore)
 Marra people of Australia
 Marra language
 Marra (surname) (including a list of persons with the name)
 Marrah Mountains in Sudan
 Marra Farm in Washington, US
 Marra, Goa, a village in Bardez, India

See also 
 Mara (disambiguation)
 Marrah (disambiguation)

Language and nationality disambiguation pages